"Forever Love" is the 7th major (and 11th overall) single by Hello! Project idol group Cute. It was released on November 26, 2008 in two editions— a normal edition (EPCE-5588), and a limited edition with a bonus DVD (EPCE-5586 - 7) and an alternative cover. The first press of each edition contained a card with a serial number, which was used in a Japan-exclusive event draw. The Single V (EPBE-5311) was released on December 10, 2008. The single debuted at number 5 in the weekly Oricon charts, remaining in the charts for 3 weeks. This was the last single to feature Kanna Arihara.

Track listings

Single V 

 Forever Love
 Forever Love (Casual Dance Ver.)

Charts

References

External links 
Forever Love at the official Hello! Project discography
Forever Love entry at the Up-Front Works discography (Zetima)

2008 singles
Japanese-language songs
Cute (Japanese idol group) songs
Songs written by Tsunku
Song recordings produced by Tsunku
Zetima Records singles
2008 songs